Konstantin Päts' first provisional cabinet was in office in Estonia from 24 February 1918 to 12 November 1918, when it was succeeded by Konstantin Päts' second provisional cabinet.

Members

References

Cabinets of Estonia
Provisional governments